The Mokvi Four Gospels is a 13th-century illuminated manuscript of the Four Gospels in Georgian, copied in the nuskhuri script and richly adorned with miniatures at the Mokvi Cathedral in Abkhazia. The Mokvi Gospels contains 329 pages, each 30 x 23.5 cm in size, and a long cycle of 157 miniatures painted on gold. The manuscript is preserved at the Georgian National Center of Manuscripts in Tbilisi.

The Mokvi Gospels, dated to 1300, was copied by the certain Ephraim at the behest of Daniel, Archbishop of Mokvi, and donated to the Cathedral of the Holy Virgin at Mokvi. Daniel himself is portrayed in one of the miniatures as praying before the Virgin Mary. Naumann and Belting assume that the author of the miniatures was trained in Constantinople around 1290 and brought the Byzantine style to Georgia. The manuscript was then transported to the Gelati Monastery near Kutaisi, where it was still kept in the 1880s. It was then brought to a museum in Tbilisi and evacuated to France after the Soviet invasion of Georgia as part of the Georgian museum treasuries in 1921. It was repatriated to then-Soviet Georgia in 1945 and found its abode at the National Center of Manuscripts. As of 2015, efforts were underway for improved conservation and repair of the manuscript.

See also 
 Bichvinta Gospels

References 

13th-century illuminated manuscripts
Georgian manuscripts
13th-century biblical manuscripts
13th century in the Kingdom of Georgia
History of Abkhazia